James Baldwin (1924–1987) was an American novelist, essayist and civil rights activist. 

James Baldwin may also refer to:

Public officials
James Fowle Baldwin (1782–1862), American civil engineer, surveyor and Massachusetts senator
James Baldwin (Los Angeles pioneer) (before 1830—after 1860), American member of Common Council
James H. Baldwin (1876–1944), American federal district judge in Montana
James N. Baldwin, American state official in New York, Excelsior College president 2016–2020

Sportsmen
James A. Baldwin (1886–1964), American football coach
Jimmy Baldwin (1922–1985), English footballer
James Baldwin (baseball) (born 1971), American right-handed pitcher
James Baldwin (racing driver) (born 1997), British racing driver

Writers
James Baldwin (editor and author) (1841–1925), American educator
James Mark Baldwin (1861–1934), American philosopher and psychologist
James T. Baldwin (1933–2018), American industrial designer and writer

Others
James J. Baldwin (1888–1955), American architect
James L. Baldwin (1921–1979), American major general

Characters
Jamie Baldwin, played by Rupert Hill on British soap opera Coronation Street

See also
Baldwin (disambiguation)